Grande Fratello VIP 6 (also known by the acronym GFVIP6)  is the sixth celebrity season of the Italian reality television franchise Grande Fratello.

It's the second season to air in 2021, and was launched on September 13 on Canale 5.

Alfonso Signorini returned as the host of the main show, with season 4 housemate Adriana Volpe and businesswoman Sonia Bruganelli as opinionists. In the fourth and fifth live shows sisters, Adriana Maria e Rosella Rota took the role of the "Popular" opinionists, and in the thirty-first and thirty-second live shows season 1 housemate Laura Freddi replaced Sonia Bruganelli who was temporarily away to celebrate New Year's Day.

On November 12, 2021, Signorini announced that the season would last until March 14, 2022, making it the longest Italian celebrity season and tying Grande Fratello 11 as the longest Italian season overall, with 183 days.

Housemates 
The age of the housemates refers to the time of entry into the house.

Guests

Nominations table

Week 1 - Week 8 
  3-in-1 housemate called 'The Selassiés', their nominations counted as one (Week 1 - 10).
  The contestant is immune.

Week 9 - Week 18 

  3-in-1 housemate called 'The Selassiés', their nominations counted as one (Week 1 - 10).
  The contestant is immune.

Week 19 - Finale 

  The contestant is immune.
  Housemate nominated by Grande Fratello as a disciplinary measure.

Notes

: On Day 1, only female housemates could vote for another female houseguest based on first impressions. Clarissa, Jessica & Lucrezia (The Selassiés) ended up having the most votes, therefore they had to face the consequence: spend the night in the beaten-down section of the house. They also had to pick a male houseguest to join them, they chose Alex.
: On Day 5, only housemates that had entered the House on Day 1 could vote for another houseguest. Furthermore, two ways to get immunity were introduced: the recurring 'Favorites of the House' immunity, given to the houseguests that received more positive votes during the previous days, and the brand new 'Favorites of the Opinionists' immunity, given by Adriana Volpe and Sonia Bruganelli to one houseguest each.
: The public did not vote to evict a housemate but the one who received the least vote would be the first nominated on Day 8. Tommaso received the least vote, therefore being the first nominated for the next nomination, and face the public vote with Davide.
: On Day 8, only housemates that had entered the House on Day 5 could vote for another houseguest. However, each of the 4 housemates that entered on Day 5 but was not given immunity (either by the House or by the Opinionists) had to pick a contestant that entered the House on Day 1 to give them the right to vote, while everyone else would be exempted. Andrea chose Gianmaria, Davide chose Manuel, Nicola chose Aldo, Samy chose Raffaella.
: Alex, Carmen, The Selassiés, Jo, Manila, Manuel, Raffaella were immuned since they are voted as the favorite of the week, while Katia and Soleil were immuned as the favorites of the opinionists. Immuned housemates nominated in confessional, and the housemates at risk for being nominated nominate in public.
: The public did not vote to evict a housemate but the one who received the most vote will receive a secret advantage on Day 15.
: As the most voted housemate by the public, Miriana was immune and had to pick one of the other three (Andrea, Gianmaria, and Nicola) to be nominated. She chose Gianmaria.
: Ainett, Alex, Jo, Katia, Manila, Manuel, Raffaella were immuned since they are voted as the favorite of the week, while Gianmaria and Soleil were immuned as the favorites of the opinionists. Immuned housemates nominated in confessional, and the housemates at risk for being nominated nominate in public.
: The public did not vote to evict a housemate but the one who received the most vote will receive a secret advantage on Day 22.
: As the most voted housemate by the public, Davide was immune and had to pick one of the other three (Amedeo, Nicola, and Samy) to be nominated. He chose Samy.
: Aldo, Alex Francesca, Katia, Manila, Manuel were immuned since they are voted as the favorite of the week, while Davide and Nicola were immuned as the favorites of the opinionists. Immuned housemates nominated in confessional, and the housemates at risk for being nominated nominate in public.
: The public did not vote to evict a housemate but the one who received the most vote will receive a secret advantage on Day 29.
: As the most voted housemate by the public, Miriana was immune and had to pick one of the other two (Gianmaria and Raffaella) to be nominated. She chose Raffaella.
: As the first four housemates were all men, the remaining male housemates were given immunity, and only the female housemates could be nominated.
: Carmen and Manila were immuned since they are voted as the favorite of the week, while The Selassiés and Francesca were immuned as the favorites of the opinionists. Male housemate nominated in confessional, and the female housemates at risk for being nominated nominate in public.
: The public did not vote to evict a housemate but the one who received the most vote will receive a secret advantage on Day 36.
: As the most voted housemate by the public, Soleil was immune and had to pick one of the other three (Miriana, Raffaella, and Sophie) to be nominated. She chose Raffaella.
: Katia and Miriana were immuned since they are voted as the favorite of the week, while Manila was immuned as the favorite of the opinionists. Male housemates nominated in confessional, and the female housemates were at risk for being nominated nominate in public.
: The public did not vote to evict a housemate but the one who received the most vote will receive a secret advantage on Day 43.
: The nominees were chosen in two different steps: first, the male housemates (plus the latest evicted contestant, Ainett) had to save one female housemate each through a saving chain (going alphabetically). Carmen was the last woman standing as she was not saved, and she became the first nominee.
: Miriana was evicted by the public, but she was revealed to have picked the Return Ticket for the women, therefore she went back into the House, skipping the nomination round.
: Soleil was voted as the favorite by the public, and she had the choice to either keep immunity for herself or give it to another female housemate (as only the women could be nominated), she decided to give her immunity to Manila.
: During the public nominations, Lulù hadn't picked a nomination card during the designated time period, therefore she was not allowed to vote.
: For not respecting the containment provisions for COVID-19, Alex is ejected from the House.
: Due to Alex's ejection and the remaining houseguests having to decide whether they wanted to continue their journey in the game, nominations were canceled.
: The houseguests that entered the House on either Day 1 or Day 5, after being informed that the season would end in March on Day 89, had to decide whether they wanted to continue to compete or leave the House. Carmen, Francesca, Gianmaria, Giucas, Katia, Lulù, Manuel, and Miriana all had to state their decisions on Day 92, while Aldo, Davide, Jessica, Manila, Soleil, and Sophie on Day 96.
: On Day 117, as there was not originally supposed to be a live show, the public vote was not closed and there was no nomination. Instead, the contestants had to pick one person publicly to be the Favorite of the House, rather than the usual mechanism of voting privately in the confessional. The most voted contestants would become the Favorites of the House for the following nomination round, on Day 120.
: Federica nominated Carmen as she didn't realize the latter had already been chosen to face the public vote by Nathaly, so her nomination was deemed null.
: Manuel had been considering abandoning the game for a few days, therefore he was exempt from nominations while finalizing his decisions or whether or not he would stay.
: Similarly to Manuel, Gianmaria had been considering abandoning the game for a few days, therefore he was exempt from nominations while finalizing his decisions or whether or not he would stay.
: The contestants that received the most votes from the public became the first candidate for a spot in the finals.
: During the public nominations, Giucas hadn't picked a nomination card during the designated time period, therefore he was not allowed to vote.
: Due to his aggressive behavior towards some of his fellow housemates and breaking the rules of the game by refusing to wear a microphone multiple times, Alessandro was punished and was automatically nominated for eviction.
: On Day 169 there was a second eviction, with the following mechanism: the contestants (excluding the finalists) were called in alphabetical order to pick a pyramid-shape (the confessional wall pieces), with one of the pyramids having a golden bottom. Jessica picked the lucky pyramid and started a saving chain in which two houseguests would be left unsaved and would go to a public vote. The two houseguests were Antonio and Miriana. The two then had the chance to get their 'revenge' by picking one person each to join them in the public vote, for a total of four contestants up for eviction. Antonio picked Sophie while Miriana picked Alessandro.
: Giucas was evicted by the public, but he was revealed to have picked the Return Ticket for the men, therefore he went back into the House.
: On Day 172 there was a second eviction, with the following mechanism: the contestants (excluding the finalists) were called in alphabetical order to pick a pyramid-shape (the confessional wall pieces), with one of the pyramids having a golden bottom. Antonio picked the lucky pyramid and started a saving chain in which one houseguest would be left unsaved and would go to a public vote. The houseguest was Sophie, who then had the chance to get her 'revenge' by picking one person to join her in the public vote, picking Davide. Davide then also had the chance to pick another person to join them, for a total of three contestants up for eviction. He picked Antonio.
: On Day 176 there was a second eviction, which simultaneously lead to the election of the third finalist. The contestants (except the previously named two finalists) were informed that they had to vote for one person to potentially become the new finalist, but that the public vote would lead to the eviction of the contestant that received the least votes. Because of this, while the nomination was technically 'to be finalist', the contestants could strategically vote for the person they wanted to evict.
: On Day 179 there was a second eviction, which simultaneously lead to the election of the fourth finalist. The previously named three finalists each had to pick one contestant among the other four to save (Delia went first as she was named the first finalist, then Lulù and finally Davide). The only contestant that was not saved, Barù, was automatically nominated and had to pick someone to join him in the public vote: he chose Sophie. The contestants were not aware while making their decisions that the public vote would also lead to the election of the fourth finalist, and were only told that the mechanism would cause an eviction.
: As the only two houseguests that had not yet been voted as finalists by the public, Giucas and Jessica were automatically nominated. While the results of the vote would be known on Day 183, the day of the finale, only the winner would actually be considered a finalist, while the loser would be the last evictee before the official start of the final.
: Once the five finalists were named, they each had to pick a pyramid-shaped confessional piece: the lucky contestant to pick the one with a golden bottom would be safe from the first two audience votes, directly reaching the Final 3. Barù picked the gold piece. Together with safety, Barù also had the duty of picking one of the other finalists: this person would be able to choose who to challenge in the first public vote duel: Barù chose Davide, who in turn chose Lulù, leaving Delia and Jessica to face off in the second duel.
: After Davide and Jessica won their respective public votes, they joined Barù and the final three was formed. A public vote with all three contestants was opened, and when it ended the housemate with the least votes (Barù) was eliminated. After that, a new public vote was opened, involving only the final two houseguests, where the votes accumulated in the previous vote were summed with the ones from the new one.

TV Ratings and guests 
Live shows

References

External links 
 Official site 

06